Diplacus layneae is a species of monkeyflower known by the common name Layne's monkeyflower. It is an annual herb that is endemic to California.

Distribution
It is endemic to California, where it is known from the mountains and slopes of the Klamath Range to the southern reaches of the Sierra Nevada. It grows in rocky barren and disturbed habitat, sometimes on serpentine soils.

Description
Diplacus layneae is a hairy annual herb producing a thin, erect stem reaching a maximum height near 28 centimeters. The oppositely arranged leaves are oval in shape and up to 2.5 centimeters in length. The tubular base of each flower is encapsulated in a ribbed calyx of sepals with pointed lobes. The flower is roughly 1 to 2 centimeters in length and any shade of pink from nearly white to deep magenta. There is usually white, yellow, and dark pink or purple mottling in the throat.

References

External links
Jepson Manual Treatment - Mimulus layneae
USDA Plants Profile
Mimulus layneae - Photo gallery

layneae
Endemic flora of California
Flora of the Cascade Range
Flora of the Klamath Mountains
Flora of the Sierra Nevada (United States)
Natural history of the California Coast Ranges
Flora without expected TNC conservation status